Phytomia is a genus of at least 27 species of hoverfly from the family Syrphidae, in the order Diptera found in tropical Africa and Asia.

Species

P. aesymnus (Walker, 1849)
P. argyrocephala (Macquart, 1842)
P. aurigera Bezzi, 1915
P. bezzii Curran, 1927
P. bullata (Loew, 1858)
P. bulligera (Austen, 1909)
P. chrysopyga (Wiedemann, 1819)
P. crassa (Fabricius, 1787)
P. curta (Loew, 1858)
P. ephippium Bezzi, 1912
P. erratica (Bezzi, 1912)
P. errans Fabricius, 1787
P. fronto (Loew, 1858)
P. fucoides Bezzi, 1915
P. fusca Hull, 1941
P. incisa (Wiedemann, 1830)
P. kroeberi Bezzi, 1915
P. natalensis (Macquart, 1849)
P. neavei Bezzi, 1915
P. noctilio Speiser, 1924
P. poensis Bezzi, 1912
P. pubipennis Bezzi, 1915
P. serena Curran, 1927
P. tenebrica Edwards, 1919
P. varians Curran, 1927
P. villipes (Loew, 1858)
P. zonata (Fabricius, 1787) (Giant Hoverfly)

Gallery

References

Hoverfly genera
Eristalinae
Diptera of Asia
Diptera of Africa
Diptera of Australasia